Paul David Brydon (born 8 December 1951) is a former road and track cyclist from New Zealand, who won the bronze medal in the men's 4000 m team pursuit at the 1974 Commonwealth Games in his native Christchurch. Brydon also represented his native country at the 1972 Summer Olympics in Munich, West Germany, where he finished in 50th place in the men's individual road race.

References

External links
 Profile New Zealand Olympic Committee

1951 births
Living people
New Zealand male cyclists
Cyclists at the 1972 Summer Olympics
Olympic cyclists of New Zealand
Commonwealth Games bronze medallists for New Zealand
Cyclists from Christchurch
Commonwealth Games medallists in cycling
Cyclists at the 1974 British Commonwealth Games
20th-century New Zealand people
Medallists at the 1974 British Commonwealth Games